The 1954 Texas Longhorns football team represented the University of Texas at Austin during the 1954 college football season. On October 2, 1954, Duke Washington became the first African-American to play in Memorial Stadium. Washington scored on a 73-yard run in the second quarter, but Texas won the game, 40–14.

Schedule

References

Texas
Texas Longhorns football seasons
Texas Longhorns football